Parañaque's at-large congressional district may refer to three occasions when a city-wide or provincewide at-large Congressional district was used for elections to the Philippine House of Representatives from Parañaque in the Philippines.

Parañaque was initially represented as part of the at-large district of the province of Manila in the Malolos Congress from 1898 to 1899. The then-town was later incorporated to the province of Rizal, established in 1901, and was represented as part of the first district of Rizal from 1907 to 1941 and from 1945 to 1972. It was incorporated to the City of Greater Manila and was represented as part of the at-large district of Manila from 1943 to 1944. Parañaque was separated from Rizal on November 7, 1975 by virtue of Presidential Decree No. 824, and was represented in the Interim Batasang Pambansa along with other Metropolitan Manila municipalities and cities as part of Region IV from 1978 to 1984.

Parañaque was grouped with Las Piñas in the Regular Batasang Pambansa from 1984 to 1986, as the Legislative district of Las Piñas–Parañaque. It was granted its own representation in the restored House of Representatives in 1987, and was divided into two districts after its city charter (Republic Act No. 8507) was amended by Republic Act No. 9229, approved on December 17, 2003.

Representation history

Notes

References 

At-large congressional districts of the Philippines
Congressional districts of Metro Manila
Politics of Parañaque